Guinusia, is a genus of crabs containing the following species:
Guinusia chabrus (Linnaeus, 1758)
Guinusia dentipes (De Haan, 1835)

References

Grapsoidea